The Beaver Independent School District is a school district based in Beaver, Oklahoma, United States. It contains an elementary school and a combined middle/high school.

See also
List of school districts in Oklahoma

References

External links
 
 Beaver Overview

School districts in Oklahoma
Education in Beaver County, Oklahoma
1886 establishments in Indian Territory
School districts established in 1886